Trimlini is a settlement south of Lendava in the Prekmurje region of Slovenia.

References

External links
Trimlini on Geopedia

Populated places in the Municipality of Lendava